Vrteška is a small village in the eastern part of North Macedonia, and is located by the mountain Plačkovica in Karbinci Municipality.

Demographics
According to the 2002 census, the village had a total of 6 inhabitants. Ethnic groups in the village include:

Macedonians 6

References

Villages in Karbinci Municipality